Zootopia+ (marketed as Zootropolis+ in Europe) is an animated spin-off web television series based on Zootopia by Byron Howard, Rich Moore and Jared Bush. Produced by Walt Disney Animation Studios, the series was released on Disney+ on November 9, 2022.

Synopsis
The anthology series features six stories that take place during the events of the original film.

Cast
 Bonnie Hunt as Bonnie Hopps
 Don Lake as Stu Hopps
 John Lavelle as Yax, Gerald Cook, Additional Voices
 Leah Latham as Fru-Fru
 Michelle Buteau as Tru-Tru
 Katie Lowes as Molly Hopps, Brianca and Mandy
 Crystal Kung Minkoff as Charisma
 Porsha Williams as Christine
 Maurice LaMarche as Mr. Big
 Alan Tudyk as Duke Weaselton
 Imari Williams as Rhino Boss and Additional Voices
 Nate Torrence as Officer Benjamin Clawhauser
 Idris Elba as Chief Bogo
 Shakira as Gazelle
 Charlotte Nicdao as Sam
 Raymond S. Persi as Flash
 Kristen Bell as Priscilla
 Byron Howard as Bucky
 Jared Bush as Pronk

Archive audio of Ginnifer Goodwin and Jason Bateman as Judy Hopps and Nick Wilde was utilized in this anthology.

Episodes

Production

Development
On December 10, 2020, Walt Disney Animation Studios chief creative officer Jennifer Lee announced that a spin-off series titled Zootopia+ and based on the 2016 film Zootopia is in development at the studio for Disney+. Trent Correy and Josie Trinidad, who worked as an animator and head of story for the film, respectively, were set to direct the series. The idea for the series was suggested by Correy during a pitch presentation in 2020, as one of three pitches for potential Disney+ series; he developed a pitch for a Zootopia series due to his interest in wanting to further explore the film's world and characters. Trinidad was originally set to direct only two episodes for the series, but her excitement to work on the project caused her to be ascended to co-director for the entire series alongside Cortney. The series was produced remotely due to the COVID-19 pandemic, which complicated the production process according to producer Nathan Curtis. Correy's pitch featured 10 stories, but four of them had to be discarded due to receiving a 6-episode order. Lee executive-produces the series alongside Zootopia co-directors and Encanto directors Byron Howard and Jared Bush.

Writing
The series was written during the storyboard process, with story artists writing lines or developing the structure for the story of each episode. Each episode explores secondary characters from Zootopia during the film's events, with the series featuring a different genre per episode, an idea conceived by Correy. He was inspired by his work on the Disney+ short Once Upon a Snowman, which focused on Olaf's story during the events of Frozen (2013). The episodes were written in chronological order, with each episode coinciding in airing with the order of the scenes they are set around.  The idea of having the series focus on secondary characters during the events of the film was conceived due to the filmmakers wanting to further explore the world and characters depicted in the film. One of episodes explores the life of mob boss Mr. Big from his childhood until his daughter's wedding in an homage to The Godfather Part II, while also exploring immigration issues.

According to Trinidad, some of the shorts were already planned by Correy, while others were conceived during production. Other ideas were changed during production, such as the episode centering on Duke Weaselton, which was originally written as a heist film in the vein of Ocean's Eleven. The idea for the final episode centering on Flash and Priscilla on a restaurant was conceived by Correy, Trinidad, and story supervisor Michael Herrera. Several ideas on how to portray the story were considered, including a nature documentary and a horror story, before conceiving an idea that centered on a new character learning to accept them, as the filmmakers felt Flash didn't "needed to change".

Animation
The series marks the first time Pixar's Presto animation software was used prominently on a non-Pixar project. Head of character Frank Hanner updated the character models from the original film to make them compatible with the software.

Production designer Jim Finn worked closely with directors of photography Joaquin Baldin and Gina Warr Lawes to develop the visual style for each episode. Editor Shannon Stein worked during the edition process to help establish each episode's distinctive tone and genre.

Music
Five of the episodes were composed by Curtis Green and Mick Giacchino. However, Giacchino's father, Michael Giacchino, who composed for the original Zootopia film, composed the music for "Duke the Musical". The song written for the same episode, "Big Time" was composed by Michael with lyrics by Kate Anderson and Elyssa Samsel (Olaf's Frozen Adventure, Central Park).

Reception

Critical reception
Alexander Navarro of MovieWeb called Zootopia+ the "perfect extension of the original Zootopia film," asserting, "Zootopia+ does show more of the world of Zootopia that viewers weren’t aware of before, following through on all the memorable characters introduced in the 2016 film. With each episode roughly having only an average of 7-minute runtimes, the series has so much more potential to be more entertaining for viewers with an increased number of episodes. While there hasn’t been much confirmation on a movie sequel, for now, fans can dive back into the gloriously colorful and eclectic world of Zootopia." Tara Bennett of IGN gave the television series a grade of 8 out of 10, writing, "Zootopia+ is a fun dip back into the world of support characters established in the 2016 Walt Disney Studios Animation movie. As is the case with most short story endeavors on Disney+, the end result is a mixed bag of episodes that range from the very funny (“The Godfather of the Bride”) to the cute (“So You Think You Can Prance”). Each is definitely entertaining and worth the watch and reminds just how fertile the world of Zootopia is for more storytelling." Diondra Brown of Common Sense Media gave Zootopia+ a grade of 4 out of 5 stars, praised the depiction of positive messages and role models, stating that the show promotes creativity, imagination, and teamwork, while noting the diverse representations across the characters and voice actors.

Accolades
Maurice LaMarche won the Outstanding Achievement for Voice Acting in an Animated Television / Broadcast Production in the 50th Annie Awards. The series was nominated for Outstanding Short-Form Series (Drama or Comedy) and Outstanding Animated Series at the 54th NAACP Image Awards.

Notes

References

External links
 

2022 American television series debuts
2020s American anthology television series
2020s American animated television series
American animated television spin-offs
American children's animated anthology television series
American children's animated comedy television series
American computer-animated television series
Animated television series about mammals
Annie Award winners
Disney+ original programming
English-language television shows
Animated television shows based on films
Television series based on Disney films
Disney animated television series
Zootopia (franchise)